Heliopyrgus sublinea, the East-Mexican white-skipper, is a species of spread-wing skipper in the butterfly family Hesperiidae.

The MONA or Hodges number for Heliopyrgus sublinea is 3970.1.

References

Further reading

 

Pyrginae
Articles created by Qbugbot